Pagyda sounanalis is a moth in the family Crambidae. It was described by Henry Legrand in 1966. It is found on the Seychelles, where it has been recorded from Aldabra, Cosmoledo and Menai.

References

Moths described in 1966
Pyraustinae